is a Japanese film director particularly known for projects concerning LGBT community issues. He won the award for Best Director at the 24th Yokohama Film Festival for Hush! and at the 33rd Hochi Film Award for All Around Us.

Filmography

References

External links

Living people
1962 births
Japanese film directors
Japanese LGBT people
People from Nagasaki Prefecture
LGBT film directors